The Reykjavík Theatre Company (RTC) was founded in 1897 when two existing companies in Reykjavík combined, performing in the then newly built Iðnó (Craftsmens' House). With Indriði Einarsson (1851-1939) as its Director, RTC became the fertile ground in which Iceland's professional theatre developed. Einarsson's dedication to professional theatre champion Sigurður Guðmundsson's (1833-1874) vision of a permanent National Theatre was key in the evolution of Iceland's professional theatre.

History
RTC was the birthplace of Icelandic theatre, eventually giving rise to Iceland's National Theatre in 1950. Some of Iceland's most renowned talent, like Stefanía Guðmundsdóttir (1876-1926), played the RTC stage. RTC has had many Directors over the years, including Einar H. Kvaran (1859-1938), Sigurjónsson, Indridi Waage (1902-1963), Lárus Pálsson (1914-1968), Gerd Grieg, Stephensen, Brynjólfur Jóhannesson (1897-1974) and Sveinn Einarsson (b. 1934). Einarsson took RTC into its modern professional era between 1963 and 1972, becoming Director of The National Theatre of Iceland in 1972. In 1989, RTC moved to the new City Theatre.

See also
Vesturport

References
Theatre Museum of Iceland: History of Icelandic Theatre

Theatre in Iceland
Theatres in Iceland
Culture in Reykjavík
Organizations based in Reykjavík